Malka or Malkah may refer to:

Places
 Malka (river), a river in Kabardino-Balkaria in Russia
 Malka Balo, one of the districts in the Oromia Region of Ethiopia
 Malka Hans, Punjab, a town in Pakistan
 Malka Jara, a settlement in Kenya's Coast Province
 Malka, Kamchatka Krai, a village on the Kamchatka Peninsula in Rusie
 Malka Mari, a settlement in Kenya's Eastern Province
 Malka, Pakistan, a town of Gujrat District in the Punjab province of Pakistan
 Malka Polyana, a village in the municipality of Aytos in Burgas Province, Bulgaria
 Malka Smolnitsa, a village in the municipality of Dobrichka in Dobrich Province, Bulgaria

People

Surname
 Judah ben Nissim al-Malkah, a Moroccan-Jewish writer and philosopher of the 13th century
 Marie Ortal Malka, Israeli musician
 Moti Malka, an Israeli footballer
 Motti Malka, mayor of the Israeli city of Kiryat
 Napki Malka, a Hephthalite king of the 6th-7th century
 Zadok Malka, a former Israeli footballer

Given name
 MALKA (musician), stage name of Tamara Schlesinger, British singer-songwriter
 Malka Drucker, an American rabbi
 Malka Lee, (1904–1976), an American poet
 Malka Marom, Canadian journalist
 Malka Spigel, Israeli musician and artist
 Malka Zimetbaum (1918–1944), or Mala Zimetbaum, a Belgian-Jewish escapee from Auschwitz

Other
 Melaveh Malkah (also Melave Malka or Melava Malka), a meal that is customarily held by Jews after their Sabbath
 Holy Leaven (Malka), a sacrament of the Church of the East

See also
Malča, a village in Serbia
Melka (disambiguation)

Maghrebi Jewish surnames